Uzovnica is a village in Serbia. It is situated in the Ljubovija municipality, in the Mačva District of Central Serbia. The village had a Serb ethnic majority and a population of 914 in 2002.

Historical population

1948: 1,255
1953: 1,324
1961: 1,239
1971: 1,050
1981: 979
1991: 990
2002: 914

References

See also
List of places in Serbia

Populated places in Mačva District
Ljubovija